Halstenbek station is on the Hamburg-Altona–Kiel line and is a railway station served by the city trains of the Hamburg S-Bahn, managed by DB Station&Service for the Hamburg S-Bahn plc, overseen by the Hamburger Verkehrsverbund. The station is located in the municipality Halstenbek in the district of Pinneberg, in Schleswig-Holstein, Germany.

Station layout
The station is an elevated island platform with 2 tracks and two exits. The station is accessible for handicapped persons via a lift at the north (main) entrance. The platforms have a tactile ground indicator system for blind persons.

Station services

Trains
The station is served by rapid transit trains of the line S3 of the Hamburg S-Bahn. Trains for Pinneberg stop on platform 1. Trains for Stade via Hamburg central station stop on platform 2.

Buses
There is a bus stop in front of the station.

Facilities at the station
No personnel are based at the station, but there are SOS and information telephones, ticket machines, 105 bicycle stands and 100 park and ride parking lots.

Gallery

See also
Hamburger Verkehrsverbund HVV

References

External links
DB station information 
Network plan HVV (pdf) 

Hamburg S-Bahn stations in Schleswig-Holstein
Buildings and structures in Pinneberg (district)
Railway stations in Germany opened in 1883